Terasterna is a genus of mites in the family Haemogamasidae.

Species
 Terasterna emeiensis (Zhou, 1981)
 Terasterna gongshenensis (Tian & Gu, 1989)
 Terasterna nanpingensis (Zhou, Chen & Wen, 1982)
 Terasterna parascaptoris (Wang & Li, 1965)
 Terasterna yunlongensis (Gu & Fang, 1987)

References

Mesostigmata